KKH may refer to:
 the Karakoram Highway in northern Pakistan
 KK Women's and Children's Hospital, formerly known as "Kandang Kerbau Hospital", a hospital in Singapore
 Kongiganak Airport (IATA code: KKH), an airport in Alaska

See also 
 kkh, the ISO 639 code for the Khün language of Myanmar
 KKh 060, a galaxy